Gang Smashers, also released as Gun Moll, is an American film released in 1938. It features an African American cast. The National Museum of African American History and Culture has a poster for the film in its collection. Leo C. Popkin directed the Million Dollar Productions film from a screenplay by Ralph Cooper. The University of South Carolina libraries have an 8-page pressbook for the film. Nina Mae McKinney stars in the film a thriller about the Harlem underworld and racketeering.

The opening of the film is a dedication to African American in law enforcement signed by Harry M. Popkin.

Cast
Nina Mae McKinney
Laurence Criner
Monte Hawley
Mantan Moreland
Reginald Fenderson
Eddie Thompson
Neva Peoples, performing a song

References

1938 films
1930s English-language films
Films directed by Leo C. Popkin
African-American films
American crime films
1930s American films